The murder of Mohebullah refers to the 2010 shooting of prisoner Mohebullah in Afghanistan by a US soldier who later pleaded guilty and was convicted by a U.S. military judge.

On October 17, 2010 "in a jail cell at a U.S. outpost in Afghanistan" prisoner Muhebullah was shot to death after Private First Class David Lawrence had unlocked the door and entered the prison cell of Mohebullah. The prisoner was "described by Army officials as a suspected Taliban commander" according to the website of FoxNews.

Trial and conviction
In a U.S. military court, PFC Lawrence was sentenced on May 25, 2011 to 12 and a half years for the premeditated murder of Mohebullah.

References

External links

21st-century American trials
People murdered in Afghanistan
Deaths by firearm in Afghanistan
2010 crimes in Afghanistan
Murder trials
2010 murders in Asia
2010 murders in Afghanistan